John Haskell (born February 10, 1958) is an American writer and editor.

He is the author of a short-story collection, I Am Not Jackson Pollock (FSG, 2003), and the novels The Complete Ballet: A Fictional Essay in Five Acts (Graywolf Press, 2017), Out of My Skin (FSG, 2009), and American Purgatorio (FSG, 2005). His stories and essays have appeared on the radio (The Next Big Thing, Studio 360), in books (The Show You'll Never Forget, Heavy Rotation, All the More Real), and in publications including A Public Space, n+1, Conjunctions, McSweeney's,) and Vice.

Haskell has taught writing and literature at Columbia University, Cal Arts, and the Leipzig University. He is the recipient of a fellowship from the John Simon Guggenheim Foundation.

Works

Novels 
 The Complete Ballet: A Fictional Essay in Five Acts (Graywolf Press, 2017)
 Out of My Skin: A Novel (Farrar, Straus and Giroux, 2009)
 American Purgatorio: A Novel (FSG, 2005)

Short-Story Collections 
 I Am Not Jackson Pollock: Stories (FSG, 2003)

References

External links 
 Official Site
 Guggenheim Memorial Foundation

21st-century American novelists
American male novelists
Living people
1958 births
American male short story writers
American male essayists
21st-century American short story writers
21st-century American essayists
21st-century American male writers